Jeppe Sebastian Kofod (born 14 March 1974) is a Danish politician of the Social Democratic Party who served as Minister of Foreign Affairs of Denmark between 27 June 2019 to 15 December 2022. 

Kofod previously served as a Member of the European Parliament (MEP) from 2014 to 2019. Within the Party of European Socialists group, he led the Social Democrats from Democrats. Kofod was a member of Danish Parliament from the Social Democrats from 1998 until 2014.

Education
From 2006 to 2007 Kofod completed a Master in Public Administration at Harvard University's John F. Kennedy School of Government.

Political career

Member of the Danish Parliament, 1998–2014
Jeppe Kofod was a Member of the Danish Parliament, the Folketing, first elected after the 1998 Danish general election for the constituency of Bornholm. During his time in the Danish Parliament he served as chairman of the Committee on Foreign Affairs.

In 2008, Kofod resigned as foreign policy spokesman for the Social Democrats after being found to have had sex with a 15-year-old member of the youth wing of the political party. Kofod was 34 years old at the time. Denmark's age of consent is 15. He commented at the time that he had shown a 'lack of judgment' in having a 'morally inappropriate relationship'. The incident had occurred at an afterparty party during a Social Democratic Youth of Denmark event on 21 March 2008 at the University of Southern Denmark.

Member of the European Parliament, 2014–2019
Kofod was the head of the Danish Socialists and Democrats' delegation and Vice-President of the Progressive Alliance of Socialists and Democrats in the European Parliament. Serving his first term, he was elected to the European Parliament at the 2014 European Parliament election, with a total of 170.739 personal votes. He was re-elected in 2019.

During his time in the European Parliament, Kofod served on the following Committees and Delegations:

 Vice-chair, European Parliament Delegation for Relations with the United States
 Rapporteur, European Parliament Special Committee on Tax Rulings and Other Measures Similar in Nature or Effect (TAXE 2)
 Member, European Parliament Committee on Industry, Research and Energy
 Substitute, European Parliament Committee on Economic and Monetary Affairs
 Substitute, European Parliament Delegation for relations with the NATO Parliamentary Assembly
 
In addition to his committee assignments, Kofod was a member of the following intergroups in the European Parliament:
 European Forum for Renewable Energy Sources (EUFORES)
 Intergroup on the Welfare and Conservation of Animals
 Intergroup on LGBTI Rights

Kofod was also a supporter of the MEP Heart Group, a group of parliamentarians who have an interest in promoting measures that help reduce the burden of cardiovascular diseases (CVD). He sat on the Executive Committee of the Association of European Parliamentarians with Africa (AWEPA).

Following the 2019 elections, Kofod was part of a cross-party working group in charge of drafting the European Parliament's four-year work program on foreign policy.

Minister of Foreign Affairs, 2019–2022

On 27 June 2019, Kofod was named Minister for Foreign Affairs in the Frederiksen Cabinet.

Early during his tenure, Kofod and Frederiksen faced a diplomatic incident when U.S. President Donald Trump confirmed his interest in buying Greenland from Denmark; at the time, Kofod said the island could not be bought “in dollars, yuan or roubles”. He later approved the establishment of a U.S. consulate in Greenland's capital Nuuk, which was widely seen as part of a broader move by the U.S. to expand its diplomatic and commercial presence in Greenland and the Arctic. In 2020, he welcomed a $12.1 million economic aid package from the U.S. government for Greenland.

Following the Bucha massacre in April 2022, Kofod expelled 15 Russian diplomats and embassy staff from Copenhagen, joining other European Union countries in its response to alleged war crimes by Russian troops in Ukraine. 

In June 2022, Kofod summoned the Russian ambassador when a Russian warship twice violated Danish territorial waters north of the Baltic Sea island of Bornholm where a democracy festival attended by senior officials and business people – including Prime Minister Frederiksen – was taking place.

At the 2022 Danish general election in November 2022 Kofod was not elected to the Folketing, and when a new government was formed in December, he was replaced by former prime minister Lars Løkke Rasmussen.

Controversies

Rape of a minor
At Easter in 2008, the then 34-year-old Jeppe Kofod appeared in the media because it emerged that in the evening after giving a lecture for the Social Democratic Youth of Denmark (DSU), he had sex with a 15-year-old girl from DSU. It was later reported that they did not use a condom, and that the girl had to use a morning after pill. The episode led, among other things, to Kofod resigning from his committee posts and his post as foreign affairs spokesman for the Social Democrats. The chairman of DSU, Jacob Bjerregaard, stated that Kofod had violated DSU's rules and that he was no longer welcome in DSU.

In 2020 Kofod was reported to the police on rape accusations by activist Lars Kragh Andersen. Following the report, the police carried out a legal assessment of the case to identify if there was a basis for another investigation into the 12-year-old case.

References

External links 
 Personal profile of Jeppe Kofod in the European Parliament's database of members
 Official profile page on the website of the Socialists and Democrats
 Official website of Jeppe Kofod (in Danish) 
 

1974 births
Living people
Politicians from Copenhagen
MEPs for Denmark 2014–2019
MEPs for Denmark 2019–2024
Members of the Folketing 1998–2001
Members of the Folketing 2001–2005
Members of the Folketing 2005–2007
Members of the Folketing 2007–2011
Members of the Folketing 2011–2015
Harvard Kennedy School alumni
Social Democrats (Denmark) MEPs
Roskilde University alumni
Foreign ministers of Denmark
Fulbright alumni